The Garland Touch is a 1962 Judy Garland album released by Capitol Records. The album assembles recordings made for other projects: six previously unissued selections had been cut in London in early August 1960, while four songs had been previously released—two on the 1958 album Judy in Love ("Do I Love You?" and "More Than You Know") and two from her recent 1961 single ("Comes Once in a Lifetime" and "Sweet Danger").

This was Garland's last studio album released during her lifetime. Later in London, Garland cut a 1964 EP for EMI Records: Judy Garland Sings Lionel Bart's Maggie May, which Capitol Records did not release in the United States until 2002 (on the compilation CD Classic Judy Garland: The Capitol Years 1955-1965). The rest of Garland's releases prior to her death in 1969 came from various concerts and soundtracks: recordings for the films Gay Purr-ee (1962) and I Could Go On Singing (1963); from her 1963–1964 CBS Television series, The Judy Garland Show; from 1964 concert performances at the London Palladium (featuring solos and duets with her daughter Liza Minnelli); and from Garland's last engagement at the Palace Theatre in 1967.

Track listing

References

External links
 The Judy Room: The Garland Touch Page

1962 albums
Judy Garland albums
Capitol Records albums